Orthaga seminivea is a species of snout moth in the genus Orthaga. It is found in Australia.

The wingspan is about 20 mm. Adults are white with a dark brown pattern.

The larvae feed on Glochidion ferdinandi. They live in a shelter of leaves joined by silk.

References

Moths described in 1895
Epipaschiinae
Endemic fauna of Australia